Owen Evans (born 19 February 1989) is a Welsh rugby union player who plays as a prop forward. Evans is a Wales Under-20 international. He is the son of former Llanelli and Welsh international prop forward Ricky Evans.

Evans played for Llandovery RFC and the Scarlets.

In September 2012 Evans signed for Newport Gwent Dragons. He joined Harlequins for the 2015–16 season.

On 15 June 2017, Evans signed for RFU Championship club Doncaster Knights ahead of the 2017–18 season.

References

External links 
Scarlets profile
Llandovery profile

1989 births
Living people
Dragons RFC players
Rugby union players from Cardigan
Welsh rugby union players
Rugby union props